Louis Pilot (11 November 1940 – 16 April 2016) was a Luxembourgian football player and manager.

In November 2003, to celebrate UEFA's jubilee, he was selected by the Luxembourg Football Federation as the country's Golden Player - the greatest player of the last 50 years.

Playing career
Pilot started his footballing career at his home town club CS Fola Esch, before signing for Belgian team Standard Liège at the age of 20. He went on to play 337 times for Standard, winning 4 Belgian league titles and 2 Belgian cups and then moved onto Royal Antwerp and Racing Jet. Pilot also represented the national team, winning 49 caps between 1959 and 1971, scoring seven goals in this time. He played in 14 FIFA World Cup qualification matches.

He retired from playing football in 1978.

Manager career
Later that year, Pilot returned to Luxembourg and became the national team coach on 12 April, leading his nation in this capacity until 1984, when he became the head coach at the club where he had enjoyed his most successful playing period, Standard Liège. He lasted only one season at Standard, before returning to Luxembourg and taking up similar roles at Etzella Ettelbruck and FC Avenir Beggen, before assuming a less active role in football.

Honours (as a player)
Belgian League: 4
 1963, 1969, 1970, 1971

Belgian Cup: 2
 1966, 1967

Luxembourgian Footballer of the Year: 4
 1966, 1970, 1971, 1972

Luxembourgian Sportsman of the Year: 2
 1968, 1969

References

External links
Bio - Profootball.lu 
Standard stats - Standard Liege
Luxembourg's Golden Player - UEFA

1940 births
2016 deaths
Sportspeople from Esch-sur-Alzette
Luxembourgian footballers
Luxembourgian expatriate footballers
Luxembourg international footballers
UEFA Golden Players
CS Fola Esch players
Standard Liège players
Royal Antwerp F.C. players
Expatriate footballers in Belgium
Luxembourgian football managers
Luxembourg national football team managers
Belgian Pro League players
Standard Liège managers
FC Etzella Ettelbruck managers
FC Avenir Beggen managers
Luxembourgian expatriate sportspeople in Belgium
Association football midfielders